Hans Kohler (25 December 1929 – 15 April 2011) was a Swiss weightlifter. He competed in the men's lightweight event at the 1960 Summer Olympics.

References

External links
 

1929 births
2011 deaths
Swiss male weightlifters
Olympic weightlifters of Switzerland
Weightlifters at the 1960 Summer Olympics
Sportspeople from the canton of Solothurn